Florida Avanue Projects or simply "Florida Projects was a public housing project in the city of New Orleans. The Florida housing development was built in 1946 on an 18.5-acre tract of land bounded by Florida Avenue and North Dorgenois, Mazant and Gallier streets in the Upper 9th Ward. It resembled most public housing complexes with 47 two and three-story brick buildings, for a total of 734 units housing 1,297 residents, that were arranged around courtyards and largely isolated from the rest of the community. It was Originally built for whites in but was desegregated and by 1970s becoming  prominently black project. In the mid-1990s, Florida and nearby Desire Projects was dubbed as the most violent housing projects in the nation. In 1994, the Florida recorded the highest homicide rate out of all HANO developments with 26 slayings, surpassing the 13 killings in the Desire which previous held the highest record a year before. Majority of the Florida killings in 1994 were fuled by drug wars, specifically between the notorious  Hardy Boys and the Poonie Crew. The homicide spike in the Florida and Desire contributed to the city becoming the "Murder Capitol of the America." That year the city's homicide rate reached 424, 47 of those killings occurred in HANO developments.

In 2005 the project was heavily flooded in Hurricane Katrina and was partly demolish by the end of 2005. One half of the complex  was remodeled.

Geography

Demographics
As of the census of 2000, there were 1,604 people, 399 households, and 346 families residing in the neighborhood.  The population density was 17,822 /mi2 (8,020 /km2).

As of the census of 2010, there were 6 people, 2 households, and 2 families residing in the neighborhood.

Notable residents
 Mannie Fresh
 Wendy Reed Randall, author, “Once There Was A Girl: A Memoir” about growing up in the Florida Housing Projects. Published December, 2020 by Kharis Publishing.^6
https://www.wendyreedrandall.com/

See also
 Neighborhoods in New Orleans

References
 
 6. https://www.amazon.com/Once-There-Was-Girl-Memoir/dp/1946277851

External links
 Florida Development on NeighborhoodLink.com

Neighborhoods in New Orleans
Public housing in New Orleans